The Jacksonville Symphony  is an orchestra based in Jacksonville, Florida.

Concert hall
As one of a handful of American orchestras with its own dedicated concert hall, the Jacksonville Symphony  performs the majority of its programs in the Robert E. Jacoby Symphony Hall at the Times-Union Center for the Performing Arts. The Robert E. Jacoby Symphony Hall is a concert hall primarily used for orchestral performances. The hall is modeled after the Wiener Musikverein in Vienna, Austria. It is designed in a shoebox shaped, similar to many European venues. It is known as a pure concert hall, providing an intimate setting with no stage curtains, orchestra pit, fly space or backstage wings. It houses The Bryan Concert Organ, which is a rebuilt Casavant Frères pipe organ. The pipe organ is made up of 6214 pipes. It is the home to the Jacksonville Symphony and the Jacksonville Symphony Youth Orchestra. Seating of 1,797 guests, it also used as an intimate concert venue.

Artistic background
Founded in 1949, Jacksonville's symphony is one of Florida's longest-standing orchestras and hosted renowned artists such as Benny Goodman, Duke Ellington, Arthur Fiedler, Victor Borge, Jack Benny, Luciano Pavarotti, Kathleen Battle, Marilyn Horne, Mstislav Rostropovich, Emanuel Ax, Joshua Bell, Midori Gotō, Leon Fleisher, Art Garfunkel, Victoria Livengood, Itzhak Perlman, Wynton Marsalis, Pinchas Zukerman, Frederica von Stade, Andre Watts, Horacio Gutierrez, André Previn, Ravi Shankar, Henry Mancini, Isaac Stern, Leontyne Price, Olivia Newton-John, Van Cliburn, Rudolph Nureyev, Michael Feinstein, Maureen McGovern, Eugenia Zukerman, Roberta Peters, Leonard Bernstein, and Sarah Chang. The Jacksonville Symphony has performed twice at Carnegie Hall, most recently in 1998.

The Jacksonville Symphony also performs in venues that vary from schools and senior citizen centers to stages throughout Florida and the Southeastern United States. Local listeners can hear weekly JSO broadcasts on WJCT-FM.  The Jacksonville Symphony has reached a national audience with appearances on National Public Radio's Performance Today and has performed twice at Carnegie Hall.

Performances

The Jacksonville Symphony  offers a variety of live symphonic music reaching a large number of residents throughout Florida and an annual attendance exceeding 200,000. Nearly one-third of these residents are children, who benefit from the Symphony's educational programs, including concerts, Jump Start Strings after-school enrichment, and the Jacksonville Symphony Youth Orchestra. In addition to a season schedule of approximately 130 concerts, Symphony musicians give educational ensemble performances in schools including Spring Park elementary and senior centers, reaching nearly 15,000 students and 1,500 seniors in the four-county area.

Music directors

 1950–1952 Van Lier Lanning
 1952–1962 James Christian Pfohl
 1962–1969 John Canarina
 1969–1970 Daniell Revenaugh
 1971–1983 Willis Page
 1984-1998 Roger Nierenberg
 1999–2014 Fabio Mechetti
 2015–Present Courtney Lewis

Radio broadcasts

Select concerts performed by the Jacksonville Symphony are broadcast Monday evenings at 7 p.m. on 89.9 FM WJCT Public Radio. "89.9 Presents the Jacksonville Symphony Orchestra" is a one-hour program featuring performance highlights – recorded in Jacoby Symphony Hall – and conversation with Jacksonville Symphony musicians along with guest artists from the program's performance.

Recordings
 2006: Carl Orff: Carmina Burana (Orff)

See also
Jacksonville Symphony Youth Orchestra
List of symphony orchestras

References

Further reading
 Jean, Betty B. (1999). The Jacksonville Symphony Orchestra: Fifty Years of Great Music. Jacksonville: Jacksonville Symphony Association.

External links
Jacksonville Symphony Official website

Music of Jacksonville, Florida
Tourist attractions in Jacksonville, Florida
Musical groups established in 1949
Orchestras based in Florida
1949 establishments in Florida